Tommy Haas and Mark Philippoussis were the defending champions, but were eliminated in the round robin competition.

Arnaud Clément and Michaël Llodra won the title, defeating Xavier Malisse and Max Mirnyi in the final, 6–3, 1–6, [10–7].

Draw

Final

Group A

Group B

External links
Gentlemen's Invitation Doubles

Men's Invitation Doubles